The 2020 season was Northern Diamonds' first season, in which they competed in the 50 over Rachael Heyhoe Flint Trophy following reforms to the structure of women's domestic cricket in England. The side topped the North Group of the competition, winning 5 of their 6 games, progressing to the final. However, they lost to Southern Vipers in the final by 38 runs.

After the ending of the Women's Cricket Super League in 2019, the ECB announced the beginning of a new "women's elite domestic structure". Eight teams were included in this new structure, with Northern Diamonds being one of the new teams, replacing Yorkshire Diamonds and representing the North East and Yorkshire. Due to the impact of the COVID-19 pandemic, only the Rachael Heyhoe Flint Trophy was able to take place. Northern Diamonds were captained by Hollie Armitage and coached by Danielle Hazell. They played two home matches at Headingley Cricket Ground and one at the Riverside Ground.

Squad
Northern Diamonds named their squad on 19 August 2020. Age given is at the start of Northern Diamonds's first match of the season (29 August 2020).

Rachael Heyhoe Flint Trophy

North Group

Fixtures

Group stage

Final

Statistics

Batting

Bowling

Fielding

Wicket-keeping

References

Northern Diamonds seasons
2020 in English women's cricket